William Murphy (born November 13, 1989) is an American professional baseball pitching coach for the Houston Astros of Major League Baseball.

Murphy grew up in Cranford, New Jersey and attended Roselle Catholic High School in Roselle, New Jersey, where he pitched for the baseball team for three years and Wagner College, where he played first base on the baseball team for one year. He coached for Georgetown University and Brown University before he was hired by the Astros before the 2016 season.

In 2022, the Astros won 106 games, the second-highest total in franchise history.  They advanced to the World Series and defeated the Philadelphia Phillies in six games to give Murphy his first career World Series title.  Astros pitchers led the American League (AL) in earned run average (ERA, 2.90), and walks plus hits per inning pitched (WHIP, 1.092), while throwing two no-hitters, including one in Game 4 of the World Series.

References

1989 births
Living people
Baseball players from New Jersey
People from Cranford, New Jersey
Roselle Catholic High School alumni
Sportspeople from Union County, New Jersey
Houston Astros coaches
Major League Baseball pitching coaches
Rutgers Scarlet Knights baseball players
Wagner Seahawks baseball players
Brown Bears baseball coaches